is a Japanese speed skater. He competed at the 1976 Winter Olympics and the 1980 Winter Olympics.

References

1956 births
Living people
Japanese male speed skaters
Olympic speed skaters of Japan
Speed skaters at the 1976 Winter Olympics
Speed skaters at the 1980 Winter Olympics
Sportspeople from Hokkaido